Laxita thuisto is an Indomalayan species in the butterfly family Riodinidae. It was described by William Chapman Hewitson in 1861.

Subspecies
L. t. thuisto (Peninsular Burma, Malaya, Sumatra, Borneo, Malaya, Langkawi, Singapore)
L. t. eutyches (Fruhstorfer, 1912) (southern Borneo, Pulau Laut, Palawan)
L. t. ephorus (Fruhstorfer, 1904) (northern Borneo)
L. t. melanotica (Riley, 1945) (Mentawai)
L. t. sawaja (Fruhstorfer, [1914]) (Burma, Mergui, Thailand)
L. t. therikles (Fruhstorfer, 1912) (Sumatra, Bangka)
L. t. esther Doubleday (Java)

References

Riodinidae
Butterflies of Indochina
Butterflies described in 1861
Taxa named by William Chapman Hewitson